Song (German: Schmutziges Geld, literally Dirty Money) is a 1928 British-German silent drama film directed by Richard Eichberg and starring Anna May Wong, Heinrich George and Mary Kid. It was made at the Babelsberg Studio. The film's sets were designed by Willi Herrmann.

Cast
 Anna May Wong as Song  
 Heinrich George as Jack Houben  
 Mary Kid as Gloria Lee  
 Hans Adalbert Schlettow as Dimitri Alexi  
 Paul Hörbiger as Sam  
 Julius E. Herrmann

References

Bibliography
 Graham Russell Gao Hodges. Anna May Wong: From Laundryman's Daughter to Hollywood Legend. Hong Kong University Press, 2012.

External links
 

1928 drama films
German drama films
British silent feature films
British drama films
1928 films
Films of the Weimar Republic
German silent feature films
Films directed by Richard Eichberg
Films scored by Paul Dessau
German black-and-white films
British black-and-white films
Films shot at Babelsberg Studios
1920s British films
Silent drama films
1920s German films